The following is a timeline of the history of Cape Town in the Western Cape province of South Africa.

Prior to 19th century

 1510 – A Portuguese force led by Francisco de Almeida is defeated in the Battle of Salt River by the indigenous Goringhaiqua Khoikhoi clan.
 1651 – Jan van Riebeeck visits the Cape as part of a rescue mission to save stranded sailors.
 1652
 6 April: Jan van Riebeeck of the Dutch East India Company arrives.
 Fort de Goede Hoop built.
 1653 – Arrival of the first slave, Abraham van Batavia.
 1654 – Redoubt Duijnhoop built.
 1658 – Conflict between the Khoi and settlers.
 1679
 Castle of Good Hope completed.
 Simon van der Stel becomes commander of Dutch colony.
 1680 Eversdal started as a farm
 1688 – French Huguenot immigrants begin arriving.
 1699
 Dutch Reformed church built.
 Parade Ground laid out.
 1705 Stellenberg today in Bellville land was awarded
 1714 Kenridge then known as Blommesteijn started. It is now part of Bellville
 1725 – Chavonnes Battery built.
 1761 – Dessinian Library established.
 1772
 Freemasonry in South Africa started
 Hospital founded.
 1780 – Lutheran Church built.
 1786 – Committee of the High Court established.
 1787 – Württemberg Cape Regiment in residence.
 1790 – Castle of Good Hope rebuilt.
 1792 The Lutheran Church in Strand Street was built
 1795
 British in power in Cape Colony.
 Johann Christian Ritter sets up printing press.
 1798
 Great fire of 1798 (Cape Town)
 Auwal Mosque built.

19th century

 1802 – Freemason's Lodge built on Bouquet Street.
 1803 – Dutch regain power in Cape Colony by the Treaty of Amiens.
 1804 – Coat of arms of Cape Town in use.
 1806
 British in power in Cape Colony again.
 Noon Gun firing begins.
 1807
 Palm Tree Mosque congregation formed.
 Slave Trade Act passed.
 1808
 Perseverance Tavern founded.
 First Slave Revolt.
 1814 – Cape Town ceded to Britain by the Anglo–Dutch Treaty of 1814.
 1819
 Commercial Exchange founded.
 Howell's bookshop in business.
 1820 – Royal Observatory founded.
 1821
 South African Public Library founded.
 Flagstaff erected on Lion's Rump hill.
 1823 – Population: 15,500.
 1824
 Green Point Lighthouse built.
 The South African Commercial Advertiser newspaper begins publication.
 South African Literary Society founded.
 1825 – South African Museum founded.
 1827 
 Colonist newspaper begins publication.
 Hoërskool Durbanville was founded. 
 1829
 Vagrancy and pass laws of 1809 repealed.
 South African College Schools was founded. 
 1830 – Cape of Good Hope Literary Gazette begins publication.
 1831 – De Zuid-Afrikaan newspaper begins publication.
 1834
 Slaves freed in British Empire.
 St. George's Church built.
 Popular Library established.
 1839 – Cape Town Municipality established.
 1840 Michiel van Breda became first mayor
 1841 
 Cape Town Mail newspaper begins publication.
 Wynberg Boys' High School was founded. 
 1844 
 Maclear's Beacon was created
 Nurul Islam Mosque founded.
 Wynberg High School for Girls was founded. 
 1845 – Mutual Life Assurance Society of the Cape of Good Hope established.
 1846
 Gaslight introduced.
 South African Mining Company founded.
 1847 – Anglican Diocese of Cape Town established.
 1848
 Hercules Crosse Jarvis becomes mayor.
 Botanic Garden established.
 St. George's Grammar School was founded. 
 1849 – 
 Anti-convict demonstrations.
 Bishops Diocesan College was founded. 
 1851 – South African Fine Arts Association organizes exhibition in the Company's Garden.
 1853 – Anti-Mormon riots.
 1854
 First establishment of the Parliament of the Cape of Good Hope
 Bookseller Jan Carel Juta in business.
 1857 – Cape Argus newspaper and Cape Monthly Magazine begin publication.
 1858 – Smallpox outbreak.
 1859 – Prison built.
 1860
 Wellington-Cape Town railway begins operating.
 Harbor works begun.
 Public Library building constructed.
 Telegraph begins operating (Simon's Town – Cape Town).
 Cape Town High School was founded. 
 1861
 Bellvile was founded
 first Railway station built.
 1863
 Horsecar trams begin operating.
 Grey Library opens.
 1864 – Somerset Hospital opens.
 1867 – District Six formed.
 1868 – Population: 22,543.
 1870 – Alfred Basin constructed.
 1871 – South African Art Gallery founded.
 1872
 The Cape attains responsible government, led by its first Prime Minister John Molteno
 Cape Government Railways founded.
 1873
 Founding of the University of the Cape of Good Hope, later UNISA
 First official use of Dutch in the Cape Parliament.
 1874
 Founding in Cape Town of the South African Teachers' Association.
 Founding of the Cape Government Railways
 The "Molteno Regulations", drawn up in Cape Town, establish the South African public library system.
 1875.
 Population: 33,000.
 The Cape's first water engineer, John Gamble, appointed by the Cape Government and begins work on Cape Town's water infrastructure.
 The Cape Town railway station built.
 Opening of Cape Western railway line (11 May 1875), Cape Town Docks to junction with mainline, 7 miles 1 chain (11.3 kilometres).
 1876
 Cape Times newspaper begins publication.
 Villagers Cricket Club is founded.
 Opening of the Cape Town to Worcester railway line (16 June 1876)
 The 2,700 ton steamer, Windsor Castle, sinks off Dassen Island, north of Table Bay (19 October 1876)
 South Africa's first official archives established by Cape Government in Cape Town.
 1877
 First South African International Exhibition is held in Cape Town.
 Cape Council of Education is established.
 1878
 Railway station enlarged.
 The first telephones are set up in the Cape.
 1879 – Wesleyan Methodist Church built.
 1880 – School of Art established.
 1881 – Opening of the Molteno Dam in Oranjezicht
 1884 
 Opening of the new Cape Parliament building
 Sea Point High School was founded. 
 1885 – Standard Bank of South Africa headquarters relocates to Cape Town.
 1886 – Houses of Parliament built.
 1887 – Kaapse Klopse minstrel festival begins.
 1889 – Newlands Cricket Ground in use.
 1890 – Newlands Rugby Stadium was opened. 
 1891
 Valkenberg Hospital and Mountain Club founded.
 Population: 51,251.
 1892 – The Franchise and Ballot Act of Cecil Rhodes places restrictions on the multiracial Cape Qualified Franchise
 1894
 Owl Club formed.
 Rustenburg High School for Girls was founded.
 1896 – Electric trams begin operating (approximate date).
 1897
 Woodhead Dam constructed.
 Museum and General Post & Telegraph Offices open.
 Rondebosch Boys' High School was founded. 
 1898 – Jewish Tailors Union organized.
 1899 – Mount Nelson Hotel in business.
 1900 
 Boston was founded by Americans
 St. James Church built.

20th century

1900s–1940s

 1901 – St. George's Cathedral, Cape Town foundations laid.
 1902
 African Political Organization founded.
 Southern Africa Association for the Advancement of Science headquartered in Cape Town.
 1904
 Tivoli music hall opens.
 Population: 77,668.
 1905 – Cape Town City Hall and Synagogue built.
 1906 – Cape University buildings begun.
 1910
 Cape Town in Cape Province becomes capital of Union of South Africa.
 Groote Schuur becomes official Cape residence of Prime Ministers of South Africa.
 1912
 Rhodes Memorial dedicated on Devil's Peak.
 Trafalgar High School was founded. 
 1913 – Botanical Society organized.
 1914
 Cape Philharmonic Orchestra active.
 Koopmans-de Wet House museum opens.
 1915 – Die Burger newspaper begins publication.
 1916 – Steenbras Dam, tunnel through the Hottentots Holland mountains and a 64 kilometre long cast iron pipeline to supply Cape Town with water.
 1918
 University of Cape Town active.
 Langa (suburb) established.
 1919 – Industrial and Commercial Workers' Union founded.
 1922 
 Pinelands (suburb) South Africa's first Garden City established and the first house built at 3 Mead Way. 
 Herschel Girls' School was founded. 
 1926 – Hoërskool Jan van Riebeeck was founded.  
 1928 – Table Mountain Aerial Cableway begins operating.
 1930
 The clay quarry and jail opened in Belville
 South African National Gallery building opens.
 1934 – UCT Ballet Company established.
 1935 
 Christmas fire of 1935
Trolleybuses begin operating.
 Windsor High School was founded. 
 1936 – St. George's Cathedral and Table Bay power station constructed.
 1937 – Hoërskool Bellville was founded. 
 1938 – Groote Schuur Hospital founded.
 1939 – Catholic Vicariate of Cape Town active.
 1940 – Mutual Building constructed.
 1942 – Varsity student newspaper begins publication.
 1945
 Duncan Dock constructed.
 Standpunte literary magazine begins publication.
 1946
 Wingfield Aerodrome active (approximate date).
 Publisher Balkema in business.
 Population: 383,891 city; 470,930 urban agglomeration.
 1948 – Nyanga (suburb) established.

1950s–1980s

 1950s – Cape Flats populated per race-based legislation.
 1950 – Maynardville Open-Air Theatre founded (1 December 1950), by the Athlone Committee for Nursery Education.
 1951 
 Population: 441,209 city; 577,648 urban agglomeration.
 Hoërskool D.F. Malan was founded. 
 Harold Cressy High School was founded. 
 1952 
 Athlone Teachers' Training College founded (February 1952), South Africa's first college for coloured teachers of pre-school children, using money raised from the Maynardville Theatre's performances.
 Pinelands High School was founded. 
 1953
 Coloured People's Organisation active.
 Westerford High School was founded. 
 1954 
 D.F. Malan Airport opens.
 Hoërskool Tygerberg was founded. 
 J.G. Meiring High School was founded. 
 1956
 Karl Bremer Hospital opened its doors
 Red Cross War Memorial Children's Hospital opens.
 Maynardville Open-Air Theatre holds its first Shakespeare performance (29 January 1956), circa five years after its founding.
 Clarke's Bookshop in business.
 Africa South magazine begins publication.
 1958 – Gugulethu (suburb) established.
 1959 
 Milnerton High School was founded. 
 Groote Schuur High School was founded. 
 1960
 Sentinel News and Contrast magazine begin publication.
 University College of the Western Cape opens.
 Milnerton Lighthouse commissioned.
 Hoërskool Eben Dönges was founded. 
 1961
 City becomes part of the Republic of South Africa.
 Cape Town railway station rebuilt.
 Gardens Commercial High School was founded.
 Oude Molen Technical High School was founded. 
 Sans Souci High School for Girls was founded. 
 1962
 Athlone Power Station commissioned.
 Naspers Centre built.
 1964
 Rivonia Trialists imprisoned to life sentence in Robben Island.
 Pollsmoor Prison established.
 Robert Selby Taylor becomes archbishop of the Anglican Diocese of Cape Town.
 Little Rivonia Trialists imprisoned to different sentences in Robben Island.
 1965 – The Settlers High School was founded. 
 1966 – Prime Minister of South Africa Hendrik Verwoerd is assassinated by Dimitri Tsafendas in the House of Assembly.
 1967 – Cape Town Philharmonia Choir founded.
 1968
 Non-whites banned from District Six and houses demolished per race-based legislation.
 Centre for Conflict Resolution headquartered in Cape Town.
 1970 – Population: 691,296 city; 1,096,597 urban agglomeration.
 1971 
 Nico Malan Theatre Center opens.
 Bosmansdam High School was founded. 
 1972
 Student protest; crackdown.
 Athlone Stadium and 1 Thibault Square built.
 Waterworks Museum and Space Theatre founded.
 1976
 Hoërskool Brackenfell was founded. 
 16. June 1976 Soweto Massacre
 August: Racial unrest.
 Mac Maharaj was released from custody of Apartheid government after serving 12 years in the Robben Island prison.
 UCT Radio begins broadcasting.
 Good Hope Centre built. 
 1977 – Fairmont High School was founded. 
 1978
 Cape Argus Cycle Race begins.
 Cape Town Civic Centre built.
 1979
 Hout Bay Museum opens.
 Steenbras Dam, Steenbras Dam – Upper, pumped storage scheme was opened to supplement Cape Towns electricity supply during periods of peak demand.
 1982 – Laloo Chiba was released from custody of Apartheid government after serving 18 years in the Robben Island prison but he was rearrested in 1985 to 1986 without a trial.
 1985 – Population: 776,617 city; 1,911,521 urban agglomeration.
 1986 
 3 March: The assassination of The Gugulethu Seven anti-apartheid group.
 Desmond Tutu becomes archbishop of the Anglican Diocese of Cape Town.
 Hoërskool Stellenberg was founded. 
 Table View High School was founded. 
 1987 
 Table Talk newspaper begins publication.
 5 November: Govan Mbeki is released from custody after serving 24 years in the Robben Island prison.
 1989
 2 September: Purple Rain Protest.
 13 September: Cape Town peace march.
 15 October: Ahmed Kathrada, Jafta Masemola, Raymond Mhlaba, Wilton Mkwayi, Andrew Mlangeni, Elias Motsoaledi, Oscar Mpetha and Walter Sisulu were released from custody of Apartheid government after some spending more than two decades in prison of Robben Island and Pollsmoor Prison.
 Monument Park High School was founded. 
 Parklands College was founded.

1990s

 1990
 3 February: Peace Ritual begins.
 11 February: Nelson Mandela gives public speech after his release from prison.
 Women's Centre organized.
 Club Eden opens.
 1991 – Population: 854,616 city; 2,350,157 metro.
 1993
 25 July: Saint James Church massacre occurs in Kenilworth.
 30 December: Heidelberg Tavern massacre occurs in Observatory.
 Metlife Centre built.
 1994
 27 April: South African general election held.
 District Six Museum opens.
 Cape Town becomes part of the new Western Cape province.
 1995
 MFM 92.6 and Voice of the Cape radio begin broadcasting.
 Two Oceans Aquarium opens.
 1995 Rugby World Cup held.
 1996
 Cape Town/Central, Tygerberg, South Peninsula, Blaauwberg, Oostenberg, and Helderberg municipalities created.
 Gallery Mau Mau active.
 Flag of Cape Town redesign adopted.
 Population: 987,007.
 1997 – Cape Talk radio begins broadcasting.
 1998
 Table Mountain National Park established.
 August: Restaurant bombing.
 1999
 Surfing competition begins.
 National Library of South Africa, Cape Town Opera, and Ajax Cape Town football team established.
 2000
 City of Cape Town metropolitan municipality formed by merger of Cape Town/Central, Tygerberg, South Peninsula, Blaauwberg, Oostenberg, and Helderberg.
 Central City Improvement District and Western Cape Anti-Eviction Campaign organized.
 MTN Sciencentre and Canal Walk shopping centre open.
 Homegrown (drum and bass event) begins.
 Institute for Justice and Reconciliation established.
Table Mountain fire (2000)

21st century

 2001
 Cape Town Pride parade begins.
 Baphumelele Children's Home founded.
 Website Capetown.gov.za launched (approximate date).
 Gold Museum opens.
 Population: 827,218.
 2002 – Northlink College was established.
 2003
 Mayoral Committee of the City of Cape Town active.
 Die Son newspaper begins publication.
 Cape Town International Convention Centre and Mzoli's open.
 2003 Cricket World Cup held.
 2004 – Africa Centre established.
 2005
 Cape Peninsula University of Technology and Cape Cobras cricket team established.
 Daily Voice newspaper begins publication.
 2006
 Cape Town Book Fair begins.
 Homeless World Cup football contest held.
 Neighbourgoods Market in business in Woodstock.
Table Mountain fire (2006)
 2007
 September: International meeting of educators produces Open Education Declaration.
 University of Cape Town's African Centre for Cities active (approximate date).
 Isango Ensemble theatre group active.
 2008
 Cape Town TV and Hillsong Church established.
 Chavonnes Battery museum opens.
 Spier Poetry Exchange (festival) and Infecting the City (arts festival) begin.
 2009
 Cape Town Stadium opens.
 Dan Plato becomes mayor.
 Silicon Cape Initiative founded.
 Organised Chaos LAN Party begins (approximate date).
Table Mountain fire (2009)
 2010
 June–July: FIFA World Cup held.
 Chippa United Football Club formed.
 2011
 MyCiTi bus begins operating.
 Patricia de Lille becomes mayor.
 Population: 433,688.
 2015 – 2018 – Cape Town water crisis

 2015 
Protea Heights Academy was founded. 
2015 Western Cape fire season 
 2016 – Cape Town City F.C. was formed. 
 2017 – September: Zeitz Museum of Contemporary Art Africa to open.
 2018
 July: International Wikimania meeting to be held in Cape Town.
August: Mayor Patricia de Lille announces her intention to resign as Mayor in October.
October: De Lille resigns as Mayor on 31 October. Deputy Mayor Ian Neilson becomes Acting Mayor.
November: Former Mayor Dan Plato is elected and sworn in as Mayor on 6 November
2019
Greenmarket Square refugee sit-in
2021
2021 Table Mountain fire
2022
2022 Parliament of South Africa fire
A heatwave hits Cape Town and breaks the cities records.

See also

 History of Cape Town
 List of mayors of Cape Town
 List of Cape Town suburbs
 Fortifications of the Cape Peninsula
 Dutch Cape Colony
 History of the Cape Colony before 1806
 History of the Cape Colony from 1806 to 1870
 History of the Cape Colony from 1870 to 1899
 History of the Cape Colony from 1899 to 1910
 Timelines of other cities in South Africa: Durban, Johannesburg, Pietermaritzburg, Port Elizabeth, Pretoria

References

Bibliography

Published in 19th century

Published in 20th century

Published in 21st century
 
 
 
 
 
 
  (about Cape Town, Johannesburg, Libreville, Lomé)

External links

  (Directory of South African archival and memory institutions and organisations)
  (Bibliography of open access  articles)
  (Images, etc.)
  (Images, etc.)
  (Images, etc.)
  (Bibliography)
  (Bibliography)
  (Bibliography)
 
 New York Public Library. Images related to Cape Town, various dates

 
Cape Town
Cape Town